Graciela Stefani (born ) is an Argentine screen and stage actress who portrayed Malala Torres-Oviedo de Santillán in Floricienta, a telenovela based on the Cinderella story. She also gives drama classes.

Filmography

External links
 

Living people
Argentine actresses
1960 births